Aleksandar Sterjov (born May 15, 1986) is a Macedonian professional basketball player who plays for Kožuv of the Macedonian First League (basketball).

External links
 
 
 
 

Macedonian men's basketball players
1986 births
Living people
Sportspeople from Skopje
Centers (basketball)
Power forwards (basketball)